"Kuolema Tekee Taiteilijan" is the third single released from the album Once by Finnish symphonic metal band  Nightwish.  It was released on November 24, 2004, by Spinefarm Records, together with the platinum edition of Once. The single was never released outside Japan and Finland.

"Kuolema tekee taiteilijan" is Finnish and means "Death Makes an Artist" in English. During the end credits on A Day Before Tomorrow, the orchestral/instrumental version of "Kuolema Tekee Taiteilijan" is audible.

Former Nightwish singer Anette Olzon performed the song at Stockholms Kulturfestival with the backing of an orchestra, and without the band, despite not speaking Finnish fluently.

Track listing
 "Kuolema Tekee Taiteilijan"
 "Symphony of Destruction" (live Megadeth Cover)
 "Creek Mary's Blood" (Orchestral Score)
 "Where Were You Last Night" (Japan only)
 "Wish I Had an Angel" (Demo) (Japan only)
 "Ghost Love Score" (Orchestral version) (Japan only)

Charts performance

Personnel
Tarja Turunen — soprano
London Philharmonic Orchestra - Orchestra and chorus

References

External links
Nightwish's official site

Nightwish songs
2004 singles
Number-one singles in Finland
Heavy metal ballads
Spinefarm Records singles
2004 songs